Chingola is a city in Zambia's Copperbelt Province, the country's copper-mining region, with a population of 216,626 (2010 census). It is the home of Nchanga Copper Mine, a deep-shaft high-grade content copper mining operation, which subsequently (in the 1960s) led to the development of two open pit operations, Chingola Open Pit and then Nchanga Open Pit (the latter being the second largest open cast mine in the world).

History
Chingola was founded in 1943, somewhat later than most other Copperbelt towns. Chingola was built to service the newly opened Nchanga copper mine. Alongside Luanshya (the "Garden Town of the Copperbelt"), Chingola is perhaps one of the best laid-out and most picturesque towns in Zambia.

Mines

Situated at the north-west end of the Copperbelt Province, the Nchanga Mines Open Pit workings lie in an arc 11 km long around the west and north of the town, covering nearly 30 km2. The deepest part of the pit is 400 m lower than the surrounding plateau.

The Mimbula Copper Project is a copper rich oxide and sulphide deposit, located on the outskirts of the town of Chingola on a mining licence held by Moxico Resources’  Zambian unit. Moxico Resources is a development and exploration mining company incorporated in the UK. In 2021, Moxico Resources began construction of a 10,000 tonne Leach Pad, Solvent Extraction and Electrowinning Plant. The Plant is expected to be operational by Q2 2022 and is planned to be expanded in phases.

Communications
A freight-only branch of Zambian Railways services the town from Kitwe. The branch includes the movement of copper ore to the smelters at Nkana in Kitwe.

In 2013, a direct link to the Benguela Railway in Angola was proposed.

Chingola is on the main Copperbelt Highway (the T3 Road) running north to Lubumbashi in DR Congo via Chililabombwe and Konkola and running south-east to Kapiri Mposhi via Kitwe and Ndola. It is also at the start of the T5 Road, running west-north-west to Solwezi and Mwinilunga.

Chingola is served by Kasompe Airport, IATA code CGJ.
Chingola is rated 5th on the most developed cities in Zambia.
The most developed areas are Nchanga South & River Side. Chingola is known to be one of the best internet service provided cities in Zambia. It is also served by 2 shopping malls: The Park Mall and the Motherland Shopping Mall.

Public facilities
The town has two hospitals: Nchanga North General Hospital (Government-owned, bed capacity 283) and Nchanga South Hospital (privately owned by the KCM (Konkola Copper Mines Plc), bed capacity about 100). The town also has sports amenities that were previously managed and maintained by the subsidiary of Zambia Consolidated Copper Mines Limited, Nchanga Division; These include Crickets Club, Swimming pool (non functional), Rugby Club, Golf Club, tennis and Cinema (now converted into a church). These clubs are all located along Fern Avenue, aside from the golf course. There are several lodges in Chingola and one notable hotel, Protea by Marriott Chingola located along Kabundi road. Nchanga Rangers Football club is the towns largest soccer club and officiates games at the towns largest soccer stadium located near Nchanga North suburbs.

During the 60's, 70's and 80's, Chingola was hailed as the cleanest and well maintained town in Zambia. This was due, in part, to the mining company's policy to manage and maintain social services in the town, particularly in residential areas where employees of the mining company resided. The mining conglomerate ZCCM Limited and its subsidiaries, such as Nchanga Division, also had a strong CSR agenda that extended to residential areas and communities not directly linked to the mines.

Features of Chingola

National Monument
 Hippo Pool on the Kafue River, 10 km north, established as a National Monument in 1954.

Other features
 Chimfunshi Wildlife Orphanage, a sanctuary for orphaned chimpanzees, lies 60 km north-west of Chingola.
 "Five Mile Rock", about 8 kilometres from Chingola on the right hand side of the road to Kitwe, is a popular landmark.
 The kapisha hot spring located in the outskirts of Kapisha compound.

Notable people born in Chingola 
 Felix Bwalya (1970–1997), Zambian boxer
 Patson Daka Soccer Player
 Samuel Matete (born 1968), Zambian athlete

References

Populated places established in 1943
Populated places in Copperbelt Province
1943 establishments in the British Empire